Vermiculine is an antibiotic isolate of Penicillium vermiculatum.

References

Macrolide antibiotics